Llansannor is a small hamlet in the Vale of Glamorgan, Wales, United Kingdom.

It has a population of roughly 200 people. It contains a parish church, a pub (the City Inn, now closed), a primary school and a village hall, which has recently been rebuilt thanks to the efforts of the parishioners.

Llansannor is traditionally a parish, until the last century comprising little more than a collection of farms spread out across Llansannor Hill (Mynydd y Fforest) and now incorporating the present hamlet of City and a collection of houses built in the grounds of Llansannor Court between the 1970s and 90's. Present day farms in the parish include Church Farm, Gelli Goll Farm and Windmill Farm. While agriculture remains important to the character of the area, many residents of the village are retirees or commute to work in nearby Cardiff.

The Valeways Millennium Heritage Trail passes through the parish, and the source of the River Thaw is nearby.

Famous residents include JPR Williams, former Welsh rugby fullback.

Population Statistics

References

External links 
www.geograph.co.uk : photos of Llansannor and surrounding area

Villages in the Vale of Glamorgan